Edda Moser (born 27 October 1938) is a German operatic soprano. She was particularly well known for her interpretations of music by Mozart. Her 1973 recital LP  received the Grand Prix du Disque.

Life and career
Moser was born in Berlin, the daughter of the musicologist Hans Joachim Moser. She is aunt to cellist Johannes Moser and pianist Benjamin Moser. She studied at the Stern Conservatory with Hermann Weißenborn and Gerty König and made her debut as Kate Pinkerton in Madama Butterfly at the Deutsche Oper Berlin in 1962. After singing in the Würzburg Opera Chorus from 1962 until 1963, she sang at the opera houses in Hagen, Bielefeld, Hamburg and Frankfurt, before joining the Vienna State Opera in 1971. She also sang in Salzburg.

She made her American debut in November 1968, when she appeared at the Metropolitan Opera in the role of Wellgunde in Das Rheingold. She went on to sing various roles there over nine seasons, including the parts of Donna Anna (Don Giovanni) and the Queen of the Night (The Magic Flute), as well as Liù in Puccini's Turandot.

She maintained an extensive repertoire, singing both coloratura and spinto soprano roles. She played Donna Anna in Joseph Losey's movie Don Giovanni. She was one of the original performers of Hans Werner Henze's oratorio Das Floß der Medusa which she created on disc because the intended premiere in Hamburg was cancelled after a classical music riot.

Opera News has said in a review of a series of recordings made in the 1980s that Moser could sing with a "finely controlled" legato."

After retiring from opera, Moser remained active as a recitalist during the late 1990s. She gave several concerts in Germany with Ivan Törzs at the piano (Dresden, Semperoper 1997, Stadttheater Gießen (1999) with programs ranging from Johann Adolph Hasse to Clara Schumann and Richard Strauss. She gave her farewell performance in Munich in 1999 at the Cuvilliés Theatre.

Edda Moser is involved in promoting the use of proper German instead of Denglisch. In 2006 she founded the yearly  (Festival of German language). Three CDs documenting this festival have appeared thus far at the German publishing house Bastei Lübbe. She was also a professor of singing at the Hochschule für Musik in Cologne.

A recording by Moser of "Der Hölle Rache kocht in meinem Herzen" from The Magic Flute was included on the Voyager Golden Record.

Recordings

Operas and operettas (studio recordings)

Beethoven – Fidelio – Leonore
D'Albert – Die Abreise – Luise
Gluck – Orfeo ed Euridice – Amor
Gounod – Faust (in German Margarethe highlights) – Marguerite
Humperdinck – Hänsel und Gretel – Knusperhexe
Kálmán – Gräfin Mariza – Manja
Lehár – Giuditta – Giuditta
Lehár – Die lustige Witwe – Hanna Glawari
Leoncavallo – Pagliacci (Der Bajazzo) – Nedda
Mozart – Apollo et Hyacinthus – Hyacinthus
Mozart – Don Giovanni – Donna Anna
Mozart – Idomeneo – Elettra
Mozart – Der Schauspieldirektor – Mademoiselle Silberklang
Mozart – Die Zauberflöte – Königin der Nacht
Orff – Prometheus – Chorführerin I
Rameau – Hippolyte et Aricie – prêtresse, chasseresse
Schubert – Die Verschworenen – Gräfin Ludmilla
Schumann – Genoveva – Genoveva
O. Strauss – Ein Walzertraum – Franzi Steingrüber
Suppé – Boccaccio – Beatrice
Verdi – Don Carlos (in German, highlights) – Elisabetta
Wagner – Das Rheingold, Götterdämmerung – Wellgunde
Weber – Abu Hassan – Fatime

Sacred music
Bach – Magnificat (BWV 243)
Beethoven – Missa Solemnis
Handel – Brockes Passion
Mozart – Krönungsmesse
Mozart – Vesperae solennes de confessore

Concert arias and operatic recitals

Virtuose Arien von WA Mozart, Orchestra of the Bavarian State Opera, Munich, EMI Electrola 1C 063-29 082 (1 LP, issued 1973)
Works:
"O zittre nicht, mein lieber Sohn, recitative and aria for the Queen of the Night from Die Zauberflöte"Der Hölle Rache kocht in meinem Herzen", aria for the Queen of the Night from Die ZauberflöteConductor: Wolfgang Sawallisch
"Popoli di Tessaglia!", K. 316, recitative and aria for soprano and orchestra
"Crudele? – Non mi dir, bell idol mio", recitative and aria for Donna Anna from Don Giovanni"Ma che vi fece, o stelle ... Sperai vicino il lido", K. 368, recitative and aria for soprano and orchestra
"Martern aller Arten" from Die Entführung aus dem SerailConductor: Leopold Hager
Awards: Grand Prix du Disque; Schallplattenpreis der Mozartgemeinde Wien
Various other albums with Mozart Concert Arias on EMI and Berlin Classics (with Jeanette Scovotti)
Mendelssohn – "Infelice! Ah, ritorna, età felice", Op. 94Opera Recital, arias from Tannhäuser, Oberon, Ariadne auf Naxos, Alceste, Rinaldo, Iphigenie en Tauride, La clemenza di Tito, Münchner Rundfunkorchester, conductor Peter Schneider
Wagner – arias (Isolde, Brünnhilde) Ljubljana Symphony Orchestra, conductor Anton Nanut

Live recordings
Handel – Rinaldo – Alcina (Met, 1984)
Henze – Novae de infinito laudesMozart – Don Giovanni – Donna Anna (Met, 1971)
Mozart – Mitridate – Aspasia
Verdi – Rigoletto – Gilda
Wagner – Die Walküre, first act – SieglindeThe Metropolitan Opera Centennial Gala (1983)

AnthologiesGreat Moments of ... Edda Moser [EMI box set]Edda Moser singt Mozart, EMI 2006

Other
Various albums on EMI with Lieder by Robert Schumann (Frauenliebe und -leben), Clara Schumann (Drei Lieder nach Friedrich Rückert), Brahms, Wolf (Mignon Lieder), Strauss (Brentano Lieder, Ophelia Lieder), Pfitzner and Schubert.

Cavalieri – Rappresentatione di Anima, et di Corpo – Vita Mondana
Henze – Cantatas Being Beauteous, Cantata della Fiaba Estrema, Whispers from Heavenly DeathHenze – Das Floß der Medusa – La Mort
Haydn – Die Jahreszeiten – Hanne
Bruno Maderna – Studi per 'Il processo' di Franz Kafka
Schumann – Das Paradies und die Peri – Die Peri
Schumann – "Des Sängers Fluch", Op. 139
Schumann – Spanisches Liederspiel, Spanische Liebeslieder, Tragödie, Liebesfrühling, MinnespielSymphonies
Beethoven – 9th symphony
Mahler – 8th symphony

Spoken word
Fairy tales for Christmas by Hans Christian Andersen
Poems to the Moon (Mondgedichte)

Bibliography
 Jürgen Kesting, Die großen Sänger (vol. 2) 1986,  "Tragische Scheuche: Edda Moser"

References

External links

Edda Moser (Soprano) on Bach Cantatas Website''

1938 births
Living people
Singers from Berlin
German operatic sopranos
20th-century German   women opera singers
Academic staff of the Hochschule für Musik und Tanz Köln
Officers Crosses of the Order of Merit of the Federal Republic of Germany